An independence referendum was held in Kosovo, then known as the Socialist Autonomous Province of Kosovo. between 26 and 30 September 1991. The dissolved  Provincial Assembly had declared the Republic of Kosova a sovereign and independent state on 22 September 1991. Over 99% of voters voted in favour of independence, with a turnout of 87%. The referendum was boycotted by Serbs living in the region, who comprised around 10% of the population.

Background
In order to pass, the referendum required a turnout of at least 66.7% and at least half of those voting in favour.

Results

Aftermath
The only United Nations member who recognised the Republic of Kosova was Albania, with a resolution recognising the country passed in the Parliament of Albania on 21 October 1991.

See also
2008 Kosovo declaration of independence
2012 North Kosovo referendum

References

1991 referendums
Kosovo
Referendums in Yugoslavia
Referendums in Kosovo
1991 in Kosovo
1991 in Yugoslavia
September 1991 events in Europe